In heraldry, the dolphin is an ornamental creature in the form of a large fish, bearing little resemblance to the true natural dolphin, a marine mammal. 

The dolphin is found as a charge in early heraldic representations, often with an arched back and fish-like fins. Its attitude is usually shown as either "naiant" – (Old French, now present participle nageant, "swimming") that is, horizontally as though swimming in water – or "hauriant" – that is, shown upright. The term "embowed" is often used, meaning with its tail curved towards the head.

The dolphin is a symbol of the Dauphins of France. Heraldic representations of dolphins also appear in the arms of many British families, and in those of maritime organisations.

References

Heraldic beasts